The Nauru national netball team represents Nauru in international netball. Their only recorded official tournament was at the Netball at the 1985 South Pacific Mini Games.

Competitive record

References

External links
 Official webpage

National netball teams of Oceania
netball